Assesse is a municipality of Wallonia located in the province of Namur, Belgium. 

On 1 January 2006, Assesse had a total population of 6,252. The total area is 78.16 km² which gives a population density of 80 inhabitants per km².

The municipality consists of the following districts: Assesse, Courrière, Crupet, Florée, Maillen, Sart-Bernard, and Sorinne-la-Longue.

The village of Crupet is noted for its grotto dedicated to Saint Anthony of Padua, the Crupet Castle, a moated medieval donjon, and its windmills.

Notable people
 Georges Gilkinet (1971), deputy prime minister.

See also
 List of protected heritage sites in Assesse

References

External links
 
 Municipal web-site (in French)

Municipalities of Namur (province)